Winner Take All is a lost 1924 American silent Western film directed by W. S. Van Dyke with Buck Jones as star. It was produced and released by the Fox Film Corporation.

Cast
 Buck Jones - Perry Blair
 Peggy Shaw - Cecil Manners
 Edward Hearn - Jack Hamilton
 Lilyan Tashman - Felicity Brown
 William Bailey - Jim Devereaux
 Ben Deeley - Charles Dunham
 Tom O'Brien - Dynamite Galloway

References

External links
  Winner Take All at IMDb.com
 

1924 films
Lost American films
Films directed by W. S. Van Dyke
Fox Film films
Lost Western (genre) films
1924 Western (genre) films
American black-and-white films
1924 lost films
Silent American Western (genre) films
1920s American films
1920s English-language films